"Crazy" is an R&B song written and recorded by Suns of Light (as the Boys) for their self-titled second album. Released as a single, the song spent one week at number one on the US R&B singles chart and peaked at number twenty-nine on the Billboard Hot 100.

Music video
At the beginning of the video, eldest brother Khiry is accidentally kicked in the back of the head during a dance rehearsal and begins to have the "craziest dream". His dream is a series of music video spoofs which include in order: "Faith" by George Michael, "Every Little Step" by Bobby Brown, "Vogue" by Madonna, "Rhythm Nation" by Janet Jackson, "Thriller" by Michael Jackson, and "Baby Don't Forget My Number" by Milli Vanilli. He then wakes up just as the nurse appears.

Charts

References

See also
List of number-one R&B singles of 1990 (U.S.)

1990 singles
1990 songs
Motown singles